MTV Party to Go Platinum Mix was the twelfth album in the MTV Party to Go series. The majority of songs on this album have appeared on previous volumes of the Party To Go series.

Track listing
California Love – 2Pac featuring Dr. Dre
Woo Hah!! Got You All in Check – Busta Rhymes
Creep – TLC
Shoop – Salt-N-Pepa
Nuthin' but a "G" Thang – Dr. Dre featuring Snoop Doggy Dogg
Real Love – Mary J. Blige
Summertime – DJ Jazzy Jeff & The Fresh Prince
Love Will Never Do (Without You) – Janet Jackson
This Is How We Do It – Montell Jordan
Scenario – A Tribe Called Quest
O.P.P. – Naughty by Nature
Here Comes the Hotstepper – Ini Kamoze
Express Yourself – Madonna
Now That We Found Love – Heavy D & The Boyz

Mtv Party To Go 12
1998 compilation albums
Tommy Boy Records compilation albums
Dance-pop compilation albums
Hip hop compilation albums